"House of 1000 Bounces" is the 11th episode of the sixth season of the animated comedy series Bob's Burgers and the overall 99th episode, and is written by Mike Benner and directed by Tyree Dillihay. It aired on Fox in the United States on April 3, 2016. When a bounce house crisis occurs during Regular-Sized Rudy's birthday party, Gene, Louise, and Tina must come to the rescue. Meanwhile, Bob tries to deal with his longstanding fear of pigeons after one shows up in his restaurant.

Plot
The Belcher kids have been invited to Rudy's birthday party in the park. However, once they arrive, they find out that there was a mix-up and Rudy doesn't have a bounce house. The company thought there was a double booking because another party at the park also ordered a bounce house. But Louise quickly comes up with a plan to steal the bounce house. With the help of Sasha, who happens to be the cousin of Dahlia the party girl, the kids push the bounce house into the lake. Since no one from Dahlia's party will go into the lake, the kids get to bounce to their hearts’ delight. Until Dahlia and her friends find boats to row out to the floating bounce house. Shortly after they let all of the air out of the inflatable, the park ranger comes by and “arrests” everyone at Rudy's party. At the ranger station, Rudy starts crying because this isn't what he wanted for his party. He just wanted to make spoon puppets and act out his script. Louise, realizing that she screwed up his party, gets everyone together to use items from the ranger station to put on Rudy's play.

Meanwhile, at the restaurant, Bob, Linda and Teddy are dealing with a pigeon that managed to get into the store and Bob is freaking out. It is later revealed that he had a fear of birds when he was young. Linda and Teddy point out that his traumatic memory is nothing more than a scene from the movie The Birds. Bob quickly gets over his fear and tries to get the bird out of the store himself. Sadly, the bird got himself covered in olive oil, leaving him unable to fly. The local animal rescue tells them to bathe the pigeon. For some reason, Bob thinks this means he has to get into the tub with the oily animal, making him less afraid of the pigeon.

Reception
Alasdair Wilkins of The A.V. Club gave the episode an A, who went on to say, "I’ve said before I’m more of a fan of episodes that intermix the adults and the kids, so it’s a testament to just how well these two episodes work—particularly in their primarily plotlines with the kids—that both stand out as season-best efforts for the show. After a couple weeks that felt an odd combination of listless and experimental, this is Bob’s Burgers leaning on what has always set it apart from its current Fox animation stablemates, namely its commitment to characters and relationships. All that’s left now is to debate which is the most perfect pairing: Louise and Rudy, Gene and Zeke, or Bob and that pigeon."

The episode received a 1.0 rating and was watched by a total of 2.05 million people.

References

External links 
 

2016 American television episodes
Bob's Burgers (season 6) episodes